Laurence Henderson Bradshaw (11 March 1899 – 1 April 1978) was an English sculptor, printmaker, and artist. Bradshaw was a life-long socialist and joined the Communist Party of Great Britain (CPGB) in the 1930s, remaining a member for the rest of his life. He is most famous for being the sculptor who created the bust of Karl Marx for the Tomb of Karl Marx in Highgate Cemetery.

During his career, he also painted posters for Transport London, the Spanish International Brigades, the British-Soviet Friendship Society, and also the Marx Memorial Library.
Spouse]] Dorothy Newby Cuff, 
One Child]] Catherine Francis Cuff
Grand children]] Jenni May Jackson born Jason Paul Jackson born 8/6/69

Early life and career 
Laurence Henderson Bradshaw was born in Chester in 1899. Laurence attended Liverpool College of Art and completed his studies in painting and sculpting in London.

During the beginning of his artistic career, Bradshaw became the assistant to Welsh artist Frank Brangwyn in the 1920s. Bradshaw's art quickly became prolific, demonstrating his wide variety of artistic talents. During the 1930s he undertook a number of public works, including sculpting the decorations for Worthing Town Hall (1933–34), and a stone relief depicting a mother and child for Oxford's Radcliffe Maternity ward (1935), which is today located within the Radcliffe Primary Care Building. As Bradshaw's fame and skills increased, he was commissioned to create numerous posters for London Transport from 1935 to 1937 to promote the rural green line bus services. 

During the Spanish Civil War Bradshaw created artworks in support of the anti-fascist forces of the International Brigades. One of these anti-fascist artworks was a hand-painted banner memorialising two International Brigade volunteers who had died in Spain, W. Langman and A. Bird, alongside 19 other volunteers with the caption "Hammersmith Communist Party Sends Greetings to Comrades Fighting in Spain".

Second World War film-making 
Fresh from creating anti-fascist artworks to promote the Spanish International Brigades, Bradshaw became an official war artist for the Norwegian government during the Second World War. Having studied film with the Soviet film-maker Sergei Eisenstein, Bradshaw produced three wartime propaganda movies for the wartime Ministry of Information. For his services to British information services during the war, Bradshaw was awarded a civil pension from the British government.

During the war, the Nazis bombed his studio, destroying many of the records of his earlier works.

Later career

Creation of Karl Marx's tomb 
By far Laurence Bradshaw's most famous work is the creation of the busts for the Tomb of Karl Marx, erected in London's Highgate Cemetery. In 1955, Bradshaw won the commission to design the Tomb of Karl Marx at his burial place in Highgate Cemetery, which was then unveiled at a ceremony in 1956. This ceremony was attended by the leader of the Communist Party of Great Britain (CPGB) Harry Pollitt, the socialist singer and black civil rights leader Paul Robeson, and the Soviet Union's British ambassador, and the president of the Marx Memorial Library scientist J. D. Bernal.

Bradshaw designed the whole of Marx's monument including the plinth and the calligraphy of the texts on the monument, but did not sign the finished work. Bradshaw considered that his design must be "...not a monument to a man only but to a great mind and a great philosopher."

The tomb was designated a Grade I listed monument in 1974.

Other achievements 
During his later career, Bradshaw was elected the Master of the Art Workers' Guild in 1958, and was also made a Fellow of the Royal Society of British Sculptors. Other notable communist figures that Bradshaw sculpted included the African-American scholar and activist W. E. B. Du Bois, the Trinidadian musician and actor Edric Connor, the Scottish poet Hugh MacDiarmid, and the British communist leader Harry Pollitt.

Bradshaw eventually became the chair of the British Soviet Friendship Society (BSFS) when Andrew Rothstein was the BSFS's president. Bradshaw created numerous artworks and illustrations for the BSFS's published materials, including the front cover of their journal in 1970 commemorating Vladimir Lenin.

In 1970 Bradshaw created an artwork commemorating Lenin in the main hall of the Marx Memorial Library. This bronze relief was unveiled on 22 April 1970 and was inscribed with the words: "1870–1924. LENIN. In this house, then the British Social Democrat's ‘Twentieth Century Press’, Lenin, leader of the victorious October Revolution, edited Iskra, the first all-Russian socialist newspaper, in 1902–3."

Death and legacy 
Laurence Henderson Bradshaw died in 1978.

After Bradshaw's death, Andrew Rothstein paid tribute to his life, praising his work and personal character:“That same profound sympathy with the wretched and the exploited; his vigorous revolt against the conditions which condemned the human race to poverty and war, brought him very many years ago to Socialism and to a consistent and unfaltering Marxism…it was Laurence Bradshaw who put first into the small model, then into the plaster enlargement from which the bronze head was cast, into every line and massive detail of the whole work, his own passionate comprehension of Marx's supreme intelligence and indomitable resolution”.Archival information for researchers regarding the life and activities of Laurence Bradshaw can be found at the Henry Moore Institute Archive in Leeds.

See also 

 Pablo Picasso
 Rutland Boughton
 Alec Wainman
 British Battalion
Noreen Branson

References

External links
Laurence Bradshaw's posters at the London Transport Museum

1899 births
1978 deaths
Alumni of Liverpool John Moores University
Alumni of the University of Liverpool
Artists from Liverpool
English communists
English printmakers
English sculptors
English male sculptors
Transport design in London
20th-century English painters
20th-century British sculptors
Communist Party of Great Britain members
20th-century British printmakers
Masters of the Art Worker's Guild
20th-century English male artists